The 6th Biathlon World Championships were held in 1965 in Elverum, Norway. The men's 20 km individual and team were the only official competitions. In these particular championships an unofficial men's 4 × 7.5 km relay was also held. It was a success, and replaced the team competition as an official event in 1966.

Men's results

20 km individual

Each shot missing the target gave a penalty of 2 minutes.

20 km team

The times of the top 3 athletes from each nation in the individual race were added together.

4 × 7.5 km relay (unofficial)

Medal table (official events)

References

1965
Biathlon World Championships
International sports competitions hosted by Norway
1965 in Norway
Elverum
Biathlon competitions in Norway
February 1965 sports events in Europe